Lajka (in English: Laika) is a 2017 Czech science fiction comedy animated film. It is inspired by Soviet space dog Laika.

Plot
In the Soviet town of Baikonur, Kazakhstan, a female stray dog is captured while scavenging for food to feed her puppies. She is named Laika and brought to the local spaceport. Professor Voroljov and his assistant Kokotov begin preparing Laika for space travel. On the day before the launch, Laika manages to get out of her cage and visits the space rocket. Then she returns for her puppies and smuggles them into the rocket.

The following day she is launched into space along with her pups hidden in the rocket. The news of Laika's travel to space arrive to the United States. The Americans, in response, send a chimpanzee named Ham to space. Ham is soon followed by other rockets with various animals.

All rockets arrive at a planet named Qem. They meet the natives of the planet and are accompanied by a native named Quirkrk. The animals are happy in the new environment as there are no humans. The Soviets however soon send cosmonaut Jurij Levobočkin to space. He is initially sent to the Moon but arrives at Qem instead. He then meets Lajka, and settles down, but soon begins craving meat. Qem's natives soon go missing; it is revealed that Levobočkin invented a "freezer gun" and is hunting and eating them. Laika and Ham are fighting him just as he is about to bake Quirkrk. The clash ends when Levobočkin falls into the furnace, and the animals leave. Levobočkin, however, survives, now wanting revenge, and the animals prepare for battle against him. The American astronaut Neil Knokaut arrives and eventually joins Levobočkin in hunting. Laika outsmarts them and Levobočkin and Knokaut freeze each other.

Voice actors
 Helena Dvořáková as Laika
 Karel Zima as Jurij Levobočkin
 Petr Čtvrtníček as Quirkrk
 Jan Vondráček as Ham
 Miroslav Táborský as Neil Knokaut
 Robert Nebřenský as Professor Voroljov
 Jan Budař as Assistant Kokotov

Awards
2017 Czech Lion Awards, Stage Design category winner

See also
List of animated feature-length films

References

External links
 
 Lajka.eu - official website

2017 films
2010s Czech-language films
2010s science fiction comedy films
Czech animated science fiction films
Czech science fiction comedy films
Czech Lion Awards winners (films)
Czech animated comedy films
Czech animated musical films
Films set in the Soviet Union
Films set in Kazakhstan
Films set in 1957
Cold War films
Animated films about dogs
Animated films about apes
Animated films about monkeys
Films about extraterrestrial life